Intruder is an electronic/pop group from Belgrade, Serbia. The band has published five LP albums to date.

Discography

Albums 

 1998 Experiment
 1999 Windows '99
 2000 Able
 2003 Strange Kind of Beautiful
 2006 Dancing Shoes Starry Skies

Singles & EPs 

 1999 A Deal with Mephisto (EP)
 1999 Cut it Again
 2001 Pretty Mama
 2002 Inevitable Sound
 2004 Doll Réveil/Star on a Fire
 2005 Soundtrack
 2005 Why Don't You?
 2006 Sensation

Notes  
 The Intruder's song "Sensation" uses the samples of the Heaven 17's 1983 song "Temptation" and the Sisters Of Mercy's 1987 song "This Corrosion".

External links 
 Official site
 Facebook page
 myspace.com profile

Serbian electronic music groups
Musical groups established in 1991
Serbian pop music groups
1991 establishments in Serbia

de:Intruder